Ommatissus is a genus of bugs in the subfamily Tropiduchinae and the tribe Trypetimorphini.

Species
Fulgoromorpha Lists on the Web includes:
 Ommatissus alpinus Linnavuori, 1973 (O. alpina in CoL)
 Ommatissus bimaculatus Muir, 1931 (O. bimaculata in CoL)
 Ommatissus binotatus Fieber, 1875 - type species
 Ommatissus bourgoini Asche, 1994
 Ommatissus chinsanensis Muir, 1913
 Ommatissus kamerunus Asche & Wilson, 1989 (O. kameruna in CoL)
 Ommatissus lofouensis Muir, 1913
 Ommatissus lybicus de Bergevin, 1930
 Ommatissus magribus Asche & Wilson, 1989
 Ommatissus natalensis Asche & Wilson, 1989
 Ommatissus tumidulus Linnavuori, 1973 (O. tumidula in CoL)
 Ommatissus (Opatissus) vietnamicus Asche & Wilson, 1989

References

External links

Auchenorrhyncha genera
Tropiduchinae